Anthony Ross (born Rosenthal, February 23, 1909 – October 26, 1955) was an American character actor whose career extended to Broadway stage, television and film.

Born in New York City, Ross was the son of Charles M. Rosenthal and Cora S. Rosenthal; he had his name changed legally. He was a graduate of Brown University and, while living in France, continued his studies at the Sorbonne and the University of Nancy. He may be best remembered for being the first to play the character of the "Gentleman Caller" in the original 1944 production of Tennessee Williams' The Glass Menagerie.
 Ross made his Broadway debut in Whistling in the Dark (1932). He also appeared on Broadway as a fictionalized version of Harold Ross, the founding editor of The New Yorker, in the 1950 Wolcott Gibbs comedy Season in the Sun.

Ross appeared in 20th Century Fox films including Kiss of Death (1947) and The Gunfighter (1950); in the Warner Bros. courtroom drama Perfect Strangers (1950) the Nicholas Ray-directed film noir, On Dangerous Ground (1952), and in the popular serial Mysterious Island (1951). He also appeared as the "Producer" in The Country Girl, both the movie and the Broadway production as well as the "Professor" in the Broadway production of Bus Stop.

He appeared in many television productions, including the 1954 CBS series The Telltale Clue in which he starred as police captain Richard Hale.

Ross was 46 when he died of a heart attack while sleeping in his apartment at 506 East 89th Street in Manhattan. A few hours earlier, he had played the supporting role of The Professor at the Tuesday evening performance of Bus Stop at the Music Box Theatre. He and his wife, Mary Jean Copeland, who was the assistant stage manager for the Broadway production of The Glass Menagerie, were the parents of a son, Stephen.

Filmography

References

External links

1909 births
1955 deaths
American male stage actors
American male film actors
American male television actors
American male radio actors
Donaldson Award winners
20th-century American male actors
Brown University alumni
University of Paris alumni
American expatriates in France